Emily Kapnek (born March 27, 1972) is an American television creator, writer and producer. Kapnek is best known for creating the animated program As Told by Ginger as well as the television series Suburgatory  and Selfie. She was a consulting producer on the television series Parks and Recreation and has written the theme songs for several shows.

Career
In 1999, Kapnek created the Nickelodeon series As Told by Ginger produced by Eryk Casemiro, Gabor Csupo, and Arlene Klasky. Kapnek also voiced the character of Noelle Sussman.  In 2005, Kapnek had two pilots produced. "Wiener Park" starred Donal Logue and Fred Willard  for FOX and Emily's Reasons Why Not for ABC, which starred Heather Graham and was based on a novel of the same name. The latter was picked up to series and premiered on 9 January 2006, but was cancelled after the first episode.  In 2007, Kapnek wrote and served as a consulting producer for Aliens in America, which aired on The CW. In 2008, Kapnek wrote a pilot for Fox titled The Emancipation of Ernesto, which starred Wilmer Valderrama.

In 2009, Kapnek served as a co-executive producer and wrote two episodes for the HBO show Hung which premiered on 28 June 2009, and ran for three seasons. From 2010 to 2011, Kapnek served as a consulting producer on the third season of the NBC series Parks and Recreation, which starred Amy Poehler and Nick Offerman.  Kapnek penned the episode "Ron and Tammy Part Two." In January 2011, it was announced ABC had picked up the pilot for Suburgatory, a show which Kapnek created. The series starred Jeremy Sisto and Jane Levy. Suburgatory premiered on 28 September 2011  and ran for three seasons. She had a Warner Bros. Television-affiliated production company called Piece of Pie Productions. That same year, Kapnek created Selfie, which starred Karen Gillan and John Cho. Selfie ran for just one season but developed a cult following after its cancellation.  In 2015, Kapnek was given a pilot commitment for Front Man, a new FOX series created by Kapnek and to be produced by Elizabeth Banks, and Max Handelman. In 2018, Kapnek wrote and produced the ABC pilot Splitting Up Together, starring Jenna Fischer and Oliver Hudson which was picked up to series and ran for two seasons on ABC.

Kapnek's new banner "Specifica Productions" (specificaproductions.com) launched in 2019 as part of her deal with ABC Studios, which was signed for a three-year contract.  In February 2020, a comedy pilot was set to star Quintessa Swindell. In November 2021, it was reported that Kapnek is working with Selfie star Karen Gillan again and Danny Elfman on a musical animation for Disney+.

Personal life
In December 2008, Emily Kapnek married Dan Lagana. They have two children: Oszkar Nosek and Guy Lagana.

Filmography

References

External links
 

American television producers
American women television producers
American television writers
American voice actresses
Living people
American women television writers
Showrunners
Place of birth missing (living people)
1972 births
American women songwriters
Songwriters from New York (state)
American voice directors
21st-century American women musicians
Nickelodeon Animation Studio people